is a 2020 Japanese 3D computer animated science fiction comedy film based on the Doraemon manga series and a sequel to the previous movie, the 2014 film Stand by Me Doraemon. Directed by Ryūichi Yagi and Takashi Yamazaki, it is primarily inspired by Doraemon's 2000 short film Doraemon: A Grandmother's Recollections and Doraemon's 2002 short film The Day When I Was Born.

Netflix acquired distribution rights to the film outside Asia (despite it streaming in Asian Netflix as a non-Netflix Original) and was released on December 24, 2021, on the streaming platform. It is the sixth highest grossing animated film of 2020.

Synopsis
Nobita - following his previous movie adventure - has managed to change his future for the better, making Shizuka marry him. Taken by despair, however, he decides to return to the past to re-meet his beloved grandmother, who died when he was still in kindergarten and whom he was really fond of. The grandmother is happy that Nobita came back in time to be with her, and confides in him a great desire: to meet his future bride. Meanwhile, the Nobita of the future, who is about to marry Shizuka and crown his "dream of happiness", is seized by a panic attack and flees into the past to see Doraemon again, fearing that he is not the right person for Shizuka.
However, the duo of Nobita and Doraemon is involved in a series of mishaps in the future, as well as the present, in order to fulfill Grandma’s wish of seeing Nobita's bride. What takes place, is a roller coaster of emotions, fun and suspense.

Voice cast

Release
It was originally scheduled to release in theaters on 7 August 2020. However, due to the COVID-19 pandemic, the film was temporarily removed from the release schedule, and was replaced by Doraemon: Nobita's New Dinosaur (which had been postponed from a previous March release). The film was then postponed to 20 November 2020 when it was given a theatrical release in Japan. The film was released in Indonesia on 19 February 2021, Malaysia on 5 March 2021 and India on 24 December 2021. Netflix released an English dub in Japan on 6 November 2021 featuring role reprisals of the cast of Bang Zoom! Entertainment's English dub of the 2005 anime. Netflix also released both the English and Japanese dub (with subtitles for each) worldwide on December 24, 2021.

Soundtrack
The theme song is Niji (Rainbow) by Masaki Suda.

Box office
Debuting on 416 screens with limitations on seating capacity due to COVID-19 pandemic, Stand by Me Doraemon 2 earned $3.7million on 305,000 admissions in its first weekend and ranked number-two on Japanese box office.

Here is a table which shows the box office of this movie of all the weekends in Japan:

Accolades

References

External links
  
 
 
 

2020 films
2020 anime films
2020 computer-animated films
Animated films about time travel
Animated films set in the future
Anime postponed due to the COVID-19 pandemic
Body swapping in films
Doraemon films
Films about weddings
Films directed by Takashi Yamazaki
Films postponed due to the COVID-19 pandemic
Films scored by Naoki Satō
Japanese sequel films
IMAX films
Japanese 3D films
Japanese computer-animated films
Japanese animated science fiction films
Shin-Ei Animation
Shirogumi
Toho animated films